Desulfonatronum thiosulfatophilum is a species of haloalkaliphilic sulfate-reducing bacteria. It is able to grow lithotrophically by dismutation of thiosulfate and sulfite.

References

Further reading

External links 
LPSN

Type strain of Desulfonatronum thiosulfatophilum at BacDive -  the Bacterial Diversity Metadatabase

Bacteria described in 2011
Desulfovibrionales